The Home and Youth Affairs Bureau is one of the policy bureaux of the Hong Kong Government. 

One of the important roles of the Home and Youth Affairs Bureau is to enhance liaison and communication with all sectors of the community including the Legislative Council and the general public.  

Alice Mak became the Secretary for Home and Youth Affairs in 2022. Shirley Lam became the Permanent Secretary for Home and Youth Affairs in 2022.

Responsibilities

Home Affairs is responsible for policies such as:

 Social Harmony and Civic Education 
 District, Community and Public Relations
 Youth development 
  
List of agencies linked to HAB:

Government Departments
 Home Affairs Department
 Information Services Department

External links
Home and Youth Affairs Bureau official website

Hong Kong government policy bureaux
1997 establishments in Hong Kong
Government agencies established in 1997